Mike Freiberg is an American attorney and politician serving in the Minnesota House of Representatives since 2013. A member of the Minnesota Democratic–Farmer–Labor Party (DFL), Freiberg represents District 43B in the central Twin Cities metropolitan area, which includes the cities of Golden Valley and Robbinsdale and parts of Hennepin County, Minnesota.

Early life, education and career
Freiberg was raised in Golden Valley, Minnesota. He earned a Bachelor of Arts degree in government and Russian from Georgetown University and a Juris Doctor from the William Mitchell College of Law.

Freiberg was a legislative aide for Representative Jim Oberstar from 1999 to 2001. He was elected to the Golden Valley City Council in 2003 and was re-elected in 2007. From 2005 to 2006, he was a committee administrator for the Minnesota Senate. He has also worked as an adjunct professor for William Mitchell College of Law. He is currently an attorney for the Public Health Law Center in Saint Paul, Minnesota.

Minnesota House of Representatives 
Freiberg was first elected to the Minnesota House of Representatives in 2012, and has been reelected every two years since.

Freiberg served as an assistant minority leader during the 2017-18 legislative session. From 201-20 he chaired the Government Operations Committee, and from 2021-2022 he chaired the Preventative Health Division of the Health Finance and Policy Committee. Freiberg is the chair of the Elections Finance and Policy Committee and sits on the Commerce Finance and Policy, State and Local Government Finance and Policy, and Ways and Means Committees.

Freiberg introduced legislation to make MLB tobacco free. He voted to increase the minimum wage from $8.00/hour to $9.50/hour over two years. He sponsored a law that allowed same-sex marriage.

Electoral results

Personal life
Freiberg has been married to his wife, Lauren, since 2006. They have two children and reside in Golden Valley, Minnesota.

References

External links

Rep. Mike Freiberg official Minnesota House of Representatives website
Rep. Mike Freiberg official campaign website

Living people
People from Golden Valley, Minnesota
Georgetown College (Georgetown University) alumni
William Mitchell College of Law alumni
Democratic Party members of the Minnesota House of Representatives
21st-century American politicians
Year of birth missing (living people)